Reinhold Ranftl (born 24 January 1992) is an Austrian professional footballer who plays as a right midfielder for Austrian Bundesliga club Austria Wien, on loan from Schalke 04. He plays for the Austria national team.

Club career
In June 2021, Schalke 04, newly relegated to the 2. Bundesliga, announced the signing of Ranftl from LASK on a three-year contract. In June 2022, he agreed to join Austria Wien on loan for the 2022–23 season with an option to make the move permanent.

International career
Ranftl made his debut for Austria national team on 19 November 2019 in a Euro 2020 qualifier against Latvia. He substituted Stefan Ilsanker in the 77th minute.

Career statistics

Club

International

Honours
LASK
Austrian 2. Liga: 2016–17

Schalke 04
2. Bundesliga: 2021–22

References

External links
 
 Reinhold Ranftl at Austrian Football Association 

1992 births
Living people
Austrian footballers
Austria youth international footballers
Austria international footballers
Association football fullbacks
Association football midfielders
Austrian Football Bundesliga players
2. Bundesliga players
FC Schalke 04 players
LASK players
TSV Hartberg players
SC Wiener Neustadt players
SK Sturm Graz players
FK Austria Wien players
Austrian expatriate footballers
Expatriate footballers in Germany